The Pennsylvania Department of Aging is a cabinet-level agency charged with providing aid to Pennsylvania's approximately three million individuals age 60 and older. Although the bureau operates some services directly, such as the Pharmaceutical Contact for the Elderly (PACE) prescription drug program, it generally serves as a clearinghouse of funding and information for county-level Area Agencies on Aging. The department was formed under the governorship of Milton Shapp.

Services
Promotes prompt service delivery to consumers through the development of efficient program operational policies and practices across all aging services.

Administrative responsibilities include the state-level management of Older Americans Act Services, Caregiver Support Program, transportation, Senior Centers, OPTIONS, Veterans' Directed Home and Community-Based Services, Domiciliary Care, Aging In Place programs, Senior Housing, and nutrition services.

Caregiver support 
The Pennsylvania Caregiver Support Program works to reduce the amount of stress not only on primary and informal caregivers but also on unpaid caregivers. Furthermore, this program helps support individuals over the age of 55 and older who care for adolescent members of their family.

These caregivers focus their efforts to aid a spouse, relative, or friend who is in need of assistance due to a disease or disability through
 Coordinated support via an appointed care manager
 Caregiving assistance
 Education
 Counseling
 Reimbursement for qualified supplies

Senior Community Service Employment Program 
 Provides employment and training services to unemployed, low-income adults age 55 and over.

Commonwealth Workforce Deployment System 
 Connects businesses and people to available services via PA CareerLink®

Office of Vocational Rehabilitation 
 Prepares persons with disabilities via vocational rehabilitation services in order to obtain, or maintain, employment.

Health and wellness 
 Health and Wellness program aims to promote healthier lifestyles among older Pennsylvanians so that there is a measurable improvement in their quality of life and subsequent reduction in overall healthcare costs. They provide workshops including fall prevention classes, nutrition classes, exercise classes, health screenings, and chronic disease self-management classes.

Help at home 
 In order to keep aging citizens in their homes for as long as possible, the Department of Aging provides several services. These include Adult Day Care, Transportation, Home-Delivered Meals, Personal Assistance, and Care Services. This also includes Home Modifications, Care Management, Home Health Care, and Respite (break from caregiving).

Housing

Property tax and rent rebate
Through the Department of Revenue, rebates are made available for Pennsylvanians 65 and older, widows age 50 and older, and adults with disabilities. The program offers a maximum standard rebate of $650. The program covers homeowners making $0 to $35,000 a year or renters making $0 to $15,000 a year. Seniors living in high property tax areas and making under $30,000 a year can boost their homeowner rebate by up to %50. Additionally, the rebate is increased by %50 in the rest of the state so long as the household makes less than $30,000 a year and the household pays at least 15 percent of its income on property taxes.

Domiciliary care
Dom Care is a group home program for adults with disabilities that need assistance, supervision, support, and encouragement for those who lack the resources or capability to live independently. Dom Care homes are individual providers' homes. They are inspected annually to meet health and safety requirements.

Insurance 
APRISE Counseling Service
 Free insurance counseling program that helps older Pennsylvanians with Medicare
 Counselors 
 Specially trained staff and volunteers
 Provide "objective, easy-to-understand information about Medicare, Medicare Supplemental Insurance, Medicaid, and Long-Term Care Insurance."

Meals

Meals at senior community centers 
 Available at nearly 600 Community Centers throughout Pennsylvania
 Available to individuals aged 60 and up, as well as their spouses
 Served once a day around noon
 Meals are prepared in coordination with each individuals diet plans, which are dependent on health issues, such as heart disease or diabetes
 They are free of charge but individuals may choose to donate

Home-delivered meals 
 Individual, or family member, participates in an interview in order to determine eligibility 
 Meals are delivered to the individual's home

Supplemental Nutrition Assistance Program (SNAP) 
 New name for the Food Stamp Program
 Seniors who utilize these benefits may also qualify for monthly food boxes
 Seniors utilize these benefits in order to buy groceries, which increases their purchasing power.

Pennsylvania Senior Farmers Market Program 
 Provides low-income older adults with four checks in order to buy fresh farm food in Pennsylvania
 Requirement is age 60 and up
 Must meet eligibility guidelines
 Each eligible senior may receive four $5.00 checks for a total of $20.00 one time during the program year.
 Married couples are eligible to receive eight $5.00 checks for a total of $40.00 one time during the program year.

Ombudsman 
 Investigate and resolve complaints and issues on behalf of the consumer of long-term care services, such as nursing homes, assisted living facilities, and personal care homes.
 Provide education about residents' rights under federal and state law
 Friendly to visitors who come to visit residents who do not have family or friends to check in on them.

Prescriptions 
Pennsylvania has two prescription programs, the Pharmaceutical Assistance Contract of the Elderly (PACE) and the Pharmaceutical Assistance Contract of the Elderly Needs Enhancement Tier (PACENET). PACE and PACENET are dedicated to helping the elderly with paying for their medications. As of the year 2014, social security's Medicare, part B premiums are no longer taken from your income tax.

Pharmaceutical Assistance Contract of the Elderly
In order to qualify for usage of PACE, as a Pennsylvania citizen, you must meet the following requirements. 
Must be 65 years of age or older. 
A resident of Pennsylvania for a minimum of 90 days prior to the date of which you apply. 
If currently enrolled in the Department of Human Services Medicaid prescription benefits you are prohibited from the PACE program. 
Single persons using the PACE program must have a total income of $14,500 or less. Married couples must not have a combined income higher than $17,700.

Pharmaceutical Assistance Contract of the Elderly Needs Enhancement Tier
In order to qualify for PACE, as a Pennsylvania citizen, you must meet the following requirements. 
Must be 65 years of age or older. 
A resident of Pennsylvania for a minimum of 90 days, prior to the date of which you apply. 
If currently enrolled in the Department of Human Services Medicaid prescription benefits you are prohibited from the PACE program. 
Single persons using the PACENET program must have a total income between $14,500 and $23,000. While married couples must have a combined income between $17,700 and $31,500.

Applicants can either apply at their local Area Agency on Aging or the Department of Aging website, www.aging.pa.gov under prescription assistance.

Protective services 
Pennsylvanians over the age of 60 are protected by the Older Adults Protective Service Act. The Older Adults Protective Service Act, passed in 1987, protects those 60 years of age or above from physical, emotional, or sexual abuse, caregiver and self-neglect, financial exploitation and abandonment. Any acts of abuse can be reported to the Area Agency of Aging, all hours of the day seven days a week. Acts of abuse can be reported by anyone by calling 1-800-450-8505. All reports made are confidential.

Transportation

Pennsylvania Free Transit Program
Provides free rides to those 65 years of age or older on local and fixed routes. Senior citizens must have their Medicare card or Commonwealth ID with them for proof of age requirement.

Shared Ride Program
Sixty-five years of age or older, those who meet these requirements receive a reduced fare. Proof of age to register for program is required. 24 hour reservations are required.

See also
 List of Pennsylvania state agencies

References

External links
Pennsylvania Department of Aging

 "Older Adults Protective Service Act" 
Northeast Adult Day Care
"PACE and PACENET Prescription Drugs for Older Pennsylvanians" 

State agencies of Pennsylvania
Government agencies established in 1978
1978 establishments in Pennsylvania